"Don Oíche Úd i mBeithil" ("That Night in Bethlehem"; archaic spelling: "Don Oidhche ud I mBeithil") is a popular Irish-language Christmas carol, of unclear origin. It is played as a reel in  time.

Origins
It has been described as going back to the 7th century AD.

Lyrics

Notable recordings
Anne-Marie O’Farrell produced a 1988 version.
The Chieftains performed the song on the 1991 album The Bells of Dublin.
A version appears on Celtic Woman's 2006 album A Christmas Celebration.
Horslips recorded the song on their 1975 album Drive The Cold Winter Away.

See also
 List of Christmas carols

References

Christmas carols
Irish Christmas songs
Irish-language songs